Ulotrichaceae is a family of green algae in the order Ulotrichales.

References

 
Ulvophyceae families
Taxa named by Friedrich Traugott Kützing